Anton Sorokin (born 21 February 1996) is a Belarusian professional footballer who plays for Baranovichi.

References

External links 
 
 

1996 births
Living people
Association football midfielders
Belarusian footballers
FC Baranovichi players
FC Neman Grodno players
FC Smorgon players